The 1999–2000 All-Ireland Senior Club Football Championship was the 30th staging of the All-Ireland Senior Club Football Championship since its establishment by the Gaelic Athletic Association in 1970-71. The championship began on 3 October 1999 and ended on 17 March 2000.

Crossmaglen Rangers entered the championship as the defending champions.

On 17 March 2000, Crossmaglen Rangers won the championship following a 1–14 to 0–12 defeat of Na Fianna in the All-Ireland final at Croke Park. It was their third championship title overall and their second title in succession.

Crossmaglen's Oisín McConville was the championship's top scorer with 3-29.

Results

Connacht Senior Club Football Championship

Quarter-final

Semi-finals

Finals

Leinster Senior Club Football Championship

First round

Quarter-finals

Semi-finals

Final

Munster Senior Club Football Championship

Quarter-finals

Semi-finals

Final

Ulster Senior Club Football Championship

Preliminary round

Quarter-finals

Semi-finals

Final

All-Ireland Senior Club Football Championship

Quarter-final

Semi-finals

Final

Championship statistics

Top scorers

Overall

In a single game

Miscellaneous

 Na Fianna won the Leinster Club Championship for the first time in their history.
 Crossmolina Deel Rovers won the Connacht Club Championship for the first time in their history.

References

1999 in Gaelic football
2000 in Gaelic football